The Romanian-language surname Morariu literally meaning "miller" may refer to:

Corina Morariu, Romanian American professional tennis player
Ana Caterina Morariu, Romanian-born Italian actress
Octavian Morariu, Romanian rugby union football player, CEO of Rugby Europe
Viorel Morariu, Romanian rugby union football player
Modest Morariu, Romanian poet, essayist and prose writer

Romanian-language surnames
Occupational surnames